Lieutenant-General George Carpenter, 1st Baron Carpenter of Killaghy, 10 February 1657 to 10 February 1731, was a member of the landed gentry from Herefordshire and career soldier in the British Army. He served as Commander-in-Chief, Scotland from 1716 to 1724 and as a Whig MP from 1715 to 1727. 

First commissioned in 1685, Carpenter took part in the 1689 to 1691 Williamite War in Ireland, then transferred to Flanders in 1692 for service in the Nine Years' War. A talented cavalry leader, he held senior positions in the Allied expeditionary force that fought in Spain during the War of the Spanish Succession. Wounded several times, he was captured at Brihuega in 1710, then later exchanged.

In January 1715, he was elected to Parliament as Whig MP for Whitchurch; although nominated as British envoy to Charles VI, Holy Roman Emperor, the appointment was cancelled when the Jacobite rising of 1715 began, and as commander of government forces in Northern England, he played a major role in ending the rebellion in England. In 1719, he became Baron Carpenter in the Peerage of Ireland; as holder of an Irish peerage, he remained an MP and in December 1722 was elected for Westminster, retaining the seat until he retired in 1727. He died in February 1732, four months after his wife Alice and was succeeded by their only son, George Carpenter, 2nd Baron Carpenter.

Personal details
George Carpenter was born on 10 February 1657 in Ocle Pychard, Herefordshire, the youngest of seven children. His parents were Warncombe and Eleanor Carpenter, whose family had owned property in the county for over 400 years, the main estate being Homme near Dilwyn. 

In January 1694, Carpenter married Alice Margetson (1660–1731), daughter of the Irish peer William Caulfeild, Viscount Charlemont and wealthy widow of John Margetson, who died at the first Siege of Limerick in 1690. They had two children, George Carpenter, 2nd Baron Carpenter (1697–1749), and Alicia (c. 1705 – bef. 1714).

Career; 1671 to 1714
In 1671, Carpenter was appointed page to Ralph Montagu, Charles II's envoy to Louis XIV of France; he returned home the next year, reportedly enlisting as a private in the Royal Horse Guards. There are few confirmed details of his career until 1685, when the accession of the Catholic James II of England led to the Monmouth Rebellion, and he was appointed quartermaster of an independent cavalry troop raised by the Earl of Manchester to help suppress it. In 1687, this troop was incorporated into Peterborough's Regiment of Horse and Carpenter received a commission as cornet.

When James was deposed by William III in the November 1688 Glorious Revolution, Carpenter's unit served in the 1689 to 1691 Williamite War in Ireland, fighting at the Boyne in 1690 and Aughrim in 1691. At Aughrim, it was ordered to cross a bog under heavy fire, prompting the Marquis de St Ruth, who was the opposing general, to shout "It is madness, but no matter, the more that cross, the more we shall kill;" he was decapitated by a cannonball shortly thereafter. 

The war in Ireland ended with the October 1691 Treaty of Limerick and the regiment was sent to Flanders, where it spent the rest of the Nine Years' War; Carpenter was promoted Lieutenant-Colonel in January 1692. After the 1697 Treaty of Ryswick, his regiment returned to Ireland as part of the garrison; in 1703, Carpenter used his wife's dowry to buy lands in County Kilkenny and became MP for Newtownards in the Parliament of Ireland. He also purchased colonelcy of the 3rd The King's Own Hussars for 1,800 guineas, a position he held until his death in 1732.

During the War of the Spanish Succession in 1704, Carpenter was appointed Quartermaster and General of Cavalry in the expeditionary force led by the Earl of Peterborough, which was sent to Spain to support the Habsburg candidate, Archduke Charles. In March 1707, Peterborough was recalled to England and replaced by the Earl of Galway, who suffered a serious defeat by Bourbon-Spanish forces at Almansa in April. Most of the Allied infantry was captured, but despite being wounded, Carpenter's repeated cavalry charges saved the guns and baggage train. 

James Stanhope took control of the British campaign in Spain; Carpenter participated in the victory at Almenara in 1710 but a few months later was captured along with Stanhope and Charles Wills at Brihuega. He was exchanged a few months later but did not see active service again before the war ended with the Treaty of Utrecht in 1714. At Brihuega, he was hit in the mouth by a musket ball which knocked out his teeth and remained lodged in his throat for nearly a year before being removed.

Career; post-1714  

When George I succeeded Queen Anne in 1714, Carpenter was nominated Envoy to Charles VI, Holy Roman Emperor, but the Jacobite rising of 1715 began before he was able to take up this position. Given command of government forces in Northern England, he prevented the Jacobites from seizing Newcastle, forcing them south to Preston, where they were attacked on 13 November by troops under Charles Wills. The next day, he was joined by Carpenter and with no possibility of escape, the Jacobites surrendered. 

Carpenter and Wills had allegedly previously clashed in Spain; despite being the senior officer, Carpenter felt Wills had taken most of the credit for this victory, while his role had been ignored. The two nearly came to blows, before the matter was smoothed over by Marlborough; Carpenter was rewarded with an appointment as Commander-in-chief, Scotland, a position he retained until 1724, and non-resident Governor of Menorca from 1716 to 1718. At the 1715 British general election, he was elected MP for Whitchurch, a Whig-controlled seat near his home of Longwood House, Hampshire. 

On 29 May 1719, he was created 'Baron Carpenter of Killaghy'; since this was an Irish peerage, it did not prevent him from remaining an MP. He was returned for Westminster at a by-election  called after the 1722 British general election result was declared void. With over 8,000 voters, Westminster was second only in number of electors to York and thus one of the most important constituencies in Parliament. The previous election was won by two Tories who were backed by Bishop Francis Atterbury, a Jacobite sympathiser and alleged leader of the Atterbury Plot; Carpenter's selection as government candidate showed his perceived reliability and appeal.    

Carpenter retired from politics at the 1727 election; he died on 10 February 1732, four months after his wife, and was buried at St Andrew's church, Owslebury in Hampshire.

Carpenter Coat of arms
The coat of arms chosen by Carpenter when created a baron is described as follows: "Paly of six, argent and gules, on a chevron azure, 3 cross crosslets or." Crest, on a wreath a globe in a frame all or. Supporters, two horses, party-perfess, embattled argent and gules. Motto: "Per Acuta Belli" (Through the Asperities of War).

References

Sources
 
 
 
 
 
 
 
 
 
 
 
 
 

1657 births
1731 deaths
People from Herefordshire
2nd Dragoon Guards (Queen's Bays) officers
3rd The King's Own Hussars officers
British Army lieutenant generals
Members of the Parliament of Great Britain for English constituencies
British MPs 1715–1722
British MPs 1722–1727
Williamite military personnel of the Williamite War in Ireland
British military personnel of the Nine Years' War
People of the Jacobite rising of 1715
British military personnel of the War of the Spanish Succession
Barons in the Peerage of Ireland
Peers of Ireland created by George I